Grundman Stadium (Itztadion Grundman) is a football stadium in Tel Aviv District city of Ramat HaSharon, Israel. It is the home stadium of Ironi Nir Ramat HaSharon. The stadium holds 4,300 and was built in 1998 and been renovated in 2012.

The stadium is named after former football player and manager Ya'akov Grundman, who played for Bnei Yehuda and managed Israel.

References 

Hapoel Nir Ramat HaSharon F.C.
Football venues in Israel
Sports venues completed in 1998
Sports venues in Tel Aviv District